Nula is a rural locality (a village) in Borisoglebskoye Rural Settlement, Muromsky District, Vladimir Oblast, Russia. The population was 7 as of 2010.

(The name Нула means zero in Latvian.)

Geography 
Nula is located on the Nulka River, 42 km north of Murom (the district's administrative centre) by road. Gorohovets is the nearest  locality.

References 

Rural localities in Muromsky District